Andrés Oppenheimer (born in Buenos Aires, Argentina) is the editor and syndicated foreign affairs columnist with The Miami Herald, anchor of "Oppenheimer Presenta" on CNN En Español, and author of seven books, several of which have been published in English, Spanish, Portuguese and Japanese. His column, "The Oppenheimer Report," appears twice a week in The Miami Herald and more than 60 U.S. and international newspapers, including the Miami Herald, El Mundo of Spain, La Nación of Argentina, Reforma of Mexico, El Mercurio of Chile and El Comercio of Peru. He is the author of Saving the Americas (Random House, 2007) and six other books, and is a regular political analyst with CNN en Español. His previous jobs at The Miami Herald included Mexico City bureau chief, foreign correspondent, and business writer. He previously worked for five years with The Associated Press in New York, and has contributed on a free-lance basis to The New York Times, The Washington Post, The New Republic, the BBC, CBS’ “60 Minutes”, and El Pais of Spain.

He was selected by the Forbes Media Guide as one of the “500 most important journalists” of the United States in 1993, and by Poder Magazine as one of the “100 most powerful people” in Latin America in 2002 and 2008.

Early life and education
Born in Buenos Aires, Argentina, he studied law, and moved to the United States in 1976 with a fellowship from the World Press Institute. After a year at Macalester College in St. Paul, Minnesota, he obtained a master's degree in journalism from Columbia University in New York City in 1978. He has honorary PhD degrees from the Galileo University of Guatemala (2004), Domingo Savio University of Bolivia (2011), and ESAN University of Peru (2014).

Awards and recognition
Oppenheimer is the co-winner of the 1987 Pulitzer Prize as a member of The Miami Herald team that uncovered the Iran-Contra scandal. He won the Inter-American Press Association Award twice (1989 and 1994), and the 1997 award of the National Association of Hispanic Journalists. He is the winner of the 1993 Ortega y Gasset Award of Spain's daily El País, the 1998 Maria Moors Cabot Award of Columbia University, the 2001 King of Spain Award, given out by the Spanish news agency EFE and King Juan Carlos I of Spain, the Overseas Press Club Award in 2002, and the Suncoast Emmy award from the National Academy of Television, Arts and Sciences in 2006.

Bibliography
Saving the Americas: The Dangerous Decline of Latin America and What the U.S. Must Do
Bordering on Chaos: Guerrillas, Stockholders, Politicians and Mexico's Road to Prosperity
Crónicas de héroes y bandidos
Ojos vendados: Estados Unidos y el negocio de la corrupción en América Latina
Cuentos chinos: El engaño de Washington, la mentira populista y la esperanza de América Latina
Basta de historias!: La obsesión latinoamericana con el pasado y las doce claves del futuro
Crear o Morir: La Esperanza de América Latina y las 5 Claves de la Innovación
¡Sálvese Quien Pueda!: El futuro del trabajo en la era de la automatización

References

External links
Columns at the Miami Herald
Biography from The Wharton School
PBS Frontline Interview
The Oppenheimer Report blog

1951 births
Living people
American people of Argentine-Jewish descent
Argentine emigrants to the United States
Argentine people of German-Jewish descent
Argentine Jews
Argentine journalists
Male journalists
Columbia University Graduate School of Journalism alumni
Macalester College alumni
Maria Moors Cabot Prize winners
People from Buenos Aires